Deuel County Courthouse and Jail in Clear Lake, South Dakota was listed on the National Register of Historic Places in 1976.  It is located on South Dakota Highway 22.

It is a three-story three-bay building built of Bedford limestone and cost $75,000 when built in 1916.  It was designed by architects Buechner & Orth.

The jail building, a two-story brick building, was built in 1899, and also served as the sheriff's residence.

References

Courthouses on the National Register of Historic Places in South Dakota
Government buildings completed in 1916
Deuel County, South Dakota
Prisons in South Dakota
Courthouses in South Dakota
1916 establishments in South Dakota